Schagen railway station serves the town of Schagen, Netherlands. The station opened on 20 December 1865 and is located on the Den Helder–Amsterdam railway. The train services are operated by Nederlandse Spoorwegen.

The train station has 3 platforms. The line between Schagen and Den Helder is single track and between Schagen and Alkmaar double track. The track between Schagen and Heerhugowaard was also single track until 1995. In 2009 the station was modernised; some roofs were replaced and two new lifts were built.

Train services
The station is served by the following service(s):

2x per hour Intercity services Schagen - Alkmaar - Amsterdam - Utrecht - Eindhoven - Maastricht (peak hours only)
2x per hour Intercity services Den Helder - Alkmaar - Amsterdam - Utrecht - Arnhem - Nijmegen

Bus services
The following bus services call at the station:

References

External links

NS website 
Dutch public transport travel planner 

Railway stations in North Holland
Railway stations opened in 1865
Railway stations on the Staatslijn K
Schagen